Jim Mill (born November 17, 1967) is an American former professional ice hockey goaltender.

In 1998, following his playing career, Mill was hired to an operations staff position with the American Hockey League (AHL). In 2001, he was promoted to Vice President, and in 2007 he was named the AHL's Executive Vice President of Hockey Operations.

From 2009-2015 he served as the assistant general manager with the Minnesota Wild of the National Hockey League (NHL). Since 2015 Mill has served as a Pro/Amateur Scout with the New Jersey Devils of the National Hockey League (NHL).

References

External links

Living people
1967 births
Huntington Blizzard players
Ice hockey people from Connecticut
Minnesota Wild executives
People from West Hartford, Connecticut
Raleigh IceCaps players
Roanoke Express players
Saint Anselm College alumni
Tallahassee Tiger Sharks players
American men's ice hockey goaltenders
Ice hockey players from Connecticut